Jim Whelan (November 8, 1948 – August 22, 2017) was an American Democratic Party politician, who served in the New Jersey State Senate where he represented the 2nd Legislative District, from January 8, 2008, until his death.

Early life
Whelan was born in Philadelphia, Pennsylvania and attended Temple University where he became a nationally ranked distance swimmer before a broken leg in his senior year cut short his career. His achievements, however, ultimately led to his induction in the Temple University Athletic Hall of Fame in 1995. He received a M.Ed. from Temple University.

Political career
In 1977, Whelan took a job in the Atlantic City School District. During this time - on a volunteer basis - he helped coach the Atlantic City High School swim team. In 1978, to draw publicity for a bid to restore the Around the Island Swim (a 22.5 mile open-water swimming race around Absecon Island), Whelan did the race solo.

Four years later, he made his first foray into politics, making an unsuccessful run for the Atlantic County Board of Chosen Freeholders in 1980. The following year, he won election to the Atlantic City Council, in 1981, and was re-elected in 1985. He won the mayor's office in a landslide in 1989. Whelan served three terms as Mayor of Atlantic City.

Whelan was elected president of the New Jersey Conference of Mayors.

Following a defeat at the hands of Lorenzo T. Langford in 2001, Whelan returned to teaching. He also served on the board of the Atlantic City Convention and Visitors Authority.

Whelan was elected to the Assembly in November 2005, unseating Republican Kirk W. Conover, who had held the seat since 2003 in this Republican-leaning district.

In 2007, Whelan won his bid for a seat in the New Jersey Senate, defeating Republican Party incumbent James J. McCullough.

Whelan won re-election in November 2011, defeating Assemblyman Vincent J. Polistina in the state's most expensive race, with more than $3 million spent by both candidates. In the 2013 election, Whelan defeated Atlantic County Sheriff Frank X. Balles 55%–45%.

Whelan served in the Senate on the State Government, Wagering, Tourism & Historic Preservation Committee (as chair); the Health, Human Services and Senior Citizens Committee; and the Economic Growth Committee.

On January 4, 2017, Whelan announced that he was planning to retire as senator.

District 2
Each of the 40 legislative districts in the New Jersey Legislature has one senator and two members of the New Jersey General Assembly.  The other representatives from the 2nd Legislative District for the 2016-2017 (217th) Legislative Session are:
Assemblyman Chris A. Brown (R)
Assemblyman Vince Mazzeo (D)

Electoral history

Death
Whelan died on August 22, 2017 at age 68 from a heart attack at his home in Atlantic City. Whelan was survived by his wife Kathy Whelan and his son Richard Whelan. Atlantic City's Boardwalk Hall was officially dedicated to his memory.

References

External links
State Senator Jim Whelan's Legislative web page, New Jersey Legislature
New Jersey Legislature financial disclosure forms
2016 2015 2014 2013 2012 2011 2010 2009 2008 2007 2006 2005
State Senator James 'Jim' Whelan, Project Vote Smart

|-

|-

1948 births
2017 deaths
Politicians from Philadelphia
American male swimmers
Mayors of Atlantic City, New Jersey
Democratic Party members of the New Jersey General Assembly
New Jersey city council members
Democratic Party New Jersey state senators
Temple University alumni
21st-century American politicians